Rai Radio Tutta Italiana is a radio channel owned and produced by the Italian state-owned public-service broadcasting organization RAI.

Until 11 June 2017 it was known as Rai Radio 4 Light and broadcast continuous pop, rock, fusion, jazz, Latin American, movie soundtrack, melodic, and easy-listening orchestral music, without commercials. In the past it had also been known as Rai Radio FD4, FD Leggera, and IV Canale Filodiffusione. Since the name change on 12 June 2017 the channel has broadcast only Italian music.

Rai Radio Tutta Italiana is distributed on Filodiffusione – the cable radio system launched in 1958 by RAI and SIP, now Telecom Italia – and also broadcast digitally using terrestrial DAB (in Italy only) and DVB-S from the Eutelsat Hot Bird 6 satellite (which covers Europe, North Africa, and the Middle East).

Since July 2017 Rai Radio Tutta Italiana also broadcast on Rai GR Parlamento which has FM-coverage during hours when there is no political programming. When there is no political debatjes mostly from 21:00 till 07:00 hrs.

Earlier logos

External links
 Official Site 
 Live Streaming 

Cable radio
Free-to-air
Radio stations established in 1958
Radio stations in Italy
RAI radio stations